Shvabe Holding is a holding company within the Russian state-owned Rostec group  responsible for development and production of high-tech optical-electronic systems both for military and civil purposes, manufacturing of optical, medical and energy-saving equipment.

Established in 2008, the company was known as JSC NPK Optical Systems and Technologies until October 26, 2012. Its companies manufacture electrooptical equipment, devices and defence systems and hi-tech civil products, such as systems for surveillance, aerospace monitoring and remote sensing, laser systems and facilities, distance gauges, target finders, photolithographic systems, precision elements and nanounits, medical equipment, surveying instruments, lighting equipment and much more. Shvabe manufactures about 6,000 product units supplied to 83 countries.

Since 2011, the holding company is registered in Yekaterinburg.

According to Rostec’s plans in 2013, Shvabe will launch an IPO within four or five years.

Structure
Companies of the holding:
 Krasnogorsky Zavod
 Lytkarino Optical Glass Factory
 NCLSK Astrophysika
 NPO Orion
 Novosibirsk Instrument-Building Plant
 Polyus Scientific Research Institute
 Research and technological institute of optical materials all-Russia scientific center "S.I.Vavilov State Optical Institute"
 Scientific and Production Association "Optica"
 Urals Optical & Mechanical Plant
 Vavilov State Optical Institute
 Vologda Optical-Mechanical Plant
 Zagorsk Optical-Mechanical Plant
 State Institute for Applied Optics, Kazan
 MZ Sapfir
 Precision Instrument Engineering Construction Bureau
 Shvabe Tech Lab, Kazan (before 2014 - TSKB "Photon" OJSC)

References

External links

  

 
Medical technology companies of Russia
Optics manufacturing companies
Companies based in Moscow